Cyanothamnus tenuis, commonly known as blue boronia, is a species of plant in the citrus family, Rutaceae, and is endemic to the southwest of Western Australia. It is a slender shrub with thread-like, sessile leaves, and flowers with four petals that are white to pink on the front and pale blue on the back.

Description
Flowering occurs from August to December.

Taxonomy and naming
Cyanothamnus tenuis was first formally described in 1839 by John Lindley in A Sketch of the Vegetation of the Swan River Colony. In 1863, George Bentham changed the name to Boronia tenuis, but in a 2013 paper in the journal Taxon, Marco Duretto and others changed the name back to C. tenuis on the basis of cladistic analysis. The specific epithet (tenuis) is a Latin word meaning "thin".

Distribution and habitat
This species grows on laterite and granite in stony soils. It is found on the Darling Scarp between Dwellingup and Wannamal in the  Jarrah Forest and Swan Coastal Plain biogeographic regions.

Conservation status
Cyanothamnus tenuis is classed as is classified as "Priority Four" by the Government of Western Australia Department of Parks and Wildlife, meaning that is rare or near threatened.

References 

tenuis
Flora of Western Australia
Plants described in 1839
Taxa named by John Lindley